The 1987 Iowa State Cyclones football team represented Iowa State University during the 1987 NCAA Division I-A football season. Home games were played on campus at Cyclone Stadium in Ames, Iowa, and they were members of the Big Eight Conference.  The Cyclones were led by first-year head coach Jim Walden, previously the head coach at Washington State in the Pac-10 for

Schedule

Game summaries

Iowa

at Oklahoma

at Nebraska

References

Iowa State
Iowa State Cyclones football seasons
Iowa State Cyclones football